Robert James Boyer (December 14, 1913 – January 20, 2005) was an Ontario journalist, author and political figure. He represented Muskoka as a Progressive Conservative member from 1955 to 1971.

Boyer was the son of George Boyer. He married Patricia Johnson. He served as a trustee of the Royal Ontario Museum and helped found the Muskoka Heritage Foundation . Boyer died in Bracebridge in 2005.

Boyer wrote a book about Bracebridge's history, A Good Town Grew Here .

References

Notes

Citations

External links 

 Death notice

1913 births
2005 deaths
People from Bracebridge, Ontario
Progressive Conservative Party of Ontario MPPs